The FEI World Cup Dressage Final is an annual international dressage series involving the world's best dressage horses and riders. It has been held since 1985. The World Cup is run in the form of a CDI.

History 

The history of the World Cup Dressage Final is closely connected to the history of the Grand Prix Freestyle. In 1984 Joep Bartels (former rider, husband of Tineke Bartels and father of Imke Schellekens-Bartels) saw Reiner Klimke and Ahlerich perform the one tempi changes to John Williams' Olympic Fanfare at the 1984 Summer Olympics. Inspired by this, he thought of a freestyle dressage competition.

One year later, the first World Cup Dressage Final was held. Each qualifier for the World Cup Final, which is held at the end of each season, consists of two competitions (Grand Prix de Dressage and Grand Prix Freestyle). From 1985 to 2001 both competitions counted for the qualifier results, which were part of the world cup ranking for this season. Since 2002, only the Grand Prix Freestyle has counted for the world cup ranking.

From 1985 to 2004 Joep Bartels was the director of the World Cup Dressage Final.

Reem Acra was the World Cup Dressage Final title sponsor from the season 2010/2011 to 2015.

Qualification to the World Cup final 
Riders, who will be part of the World Cup Dressage Final, have two options to qualify for this event.

The first option is, to qualify oneself by one World Cup league. There are four Dressage World Cup leagues:

Generally, only three participants per nation are allowed to participate in the World Cup final.

In addition, the FEI awards two extra starting places to riders that have not qualified for the World Cup finals. Unused starting places can also be allocated by the FEI as extra starting places.

To participate with a horse in the World Cup final, a rider (which starts in one of the leagues) has to start with this horse in two World Cup qualifiers. In this competition, the rider has to complete the competition with at least 68.000%.

The title holder is automatically qualified for the World Cup final, but he/she must also qualify his horse in the above called way. If he/she starts in a qualifier, he/she is not considered in the scoring (scoring points) of this event.

Allocation of scoring points 
The scoring of the league is set only for the European leagues by the FEI. The North American and the Pacific Leagues have their own regulations.

European leagues 
In the European leagues the number of scoring points of each rider decide on the qualification of the rider for the World Cup final. The points are awarded in the Grand Prix Freestyle according to the following system:
 1st rank: 20 points
 2nd rank: 17 points
 3rd rank: 15 points
 4th rank: 13 points
 5th rank: 12 points
 6th rank: 11 points
 7th rank: 10 points
 8th rank: 9 points
 9th rank: 8 points
 10th rank: 7 points
 11th rank: 6 points
 12th rank: 5 points
 13th rank: 4 points
 14th rank: 3 points
 15th rank: 2 points

If the 15th rank awarded several times, all riders of this rank will get 2 scoring points.

North American League 
In the North American League each rider has to start in two qualifiers to have the chance to start in the World Cup final. The best two Grand Prix Freestyle results of each rider by World Cup qualifiers are added and then divided by two. The two riders with the best scoring of this procedure are qualified for the World Cup final.

Pacific League 
The Pacific League has no scoring ranking. Riders, who have to complete a Grand Prix Freestyle competition at a CDI 3* or CDI-W in the Pacific League region with at least 62.000%, have the chance to start at the Pacific League final. This league final is held between December and February in Australia or New Zealand. The winner of this league final are qualified for the World Cup final.

World Cup final 
The World Cup final is held at the end of each Dressage World Cup season in March or April. The first competition of the final is the Grand Prix de Dressage, the winner of the second competition of the final (the Grand Prix Freestyle) is the winner of this World Cup season.

World Cup winners

External links 

 Official Dressage World Cup Website
 Dressage World Cup rules
Denmark has been appointed to host the ECCO FEI World Championships - Denmark 2022 in jumping, dressage, para-dressage and vaulting

References